Manning Island is an island in the vicinity of Antarctica. It was named after surveyor John Manning, in honour of his work in Antarctica.  The Lars Christensen expedition of 1936-1937 photographed it from the air, calling it Viksy (Bay Island).

See also 
 SCAR Composite Gazetteer of Antarctica
 List of Antarctic islands south of 60° S
 SCAR
 Territorial claims in Antarctica

References

External links
 SCAR Composite Gazetteer of Antarctica

Islands of Princess Elizabeth Land